Gökçeören (also Gökçeviran) is a village in the district of Osmangazi, Bursa Province, Turkey.

References

Villages in Osmangazi District